Ichnusaite (pronounced iknusa-ait) is a very rarely found mineral. Ichnusaite is a natural compound of thorium and molybdenum with the formula Th(MoO4)2·3H2O. It was discovered in Su Seinargiu, Sarroch, Cagliari, Sardegna, Italy in 2013. The name is from the old Greek name of Sardinia, Ιχνουσσα, Ichnusa. This locality is also a place of discovery of the second  natural thorium molybdate - nuragheite.

Occurrence and association
Muscovite, nuragheite, and xenotime-(Y) are the associates of ichnusaite.

Notes on chemistry
Ichnusaite is chemically pure.

Crystal structure
The main features of the crystal structure of ichnusaite are:
 electroneutral Th(MoO4)2(H2O)2 (100) sheets
 ThO7(H2O)2 and MoO4 polyhedra polymerize to give the above sheets
 sheets are stacked along [100] and held by hydrogen bonds

Bibliography
 Orlandi, P., Biagioni, C., Bindi, L. und Nestola, F. (2013) Ichnusaite, IMA 2013- 087. CNMNC Newsletter No. 18, December 2013, page 3255; Mineralogical Magazine, 77, 3249-325
 http://rruff.geo.arizona.edu/AMS/result.php?mineral=Ichnusaite
 https://web.archive.org/web/20160521090233/http://ammin.geoscienceworld.org/content/99/10/2089
 https://arpi.unipi.it/handle/11568/638691#.Vr93OUKuAt4 
 http://www.degruyter.com/dg/viewarticle/j$002fammin.2014.99.issue-10$002fam-2014-4844$002fam-2014-4844.xml
 https://www.bbc.com/news/science-environment-35569659

References

Molybdate minerals
Thorium minerals
Monoclinic minerals
Minerals in space group 14